Dr. Pierre De Muelenaere (born 25 October 1958) is a Belgian entrepreneur and scientist. In 1987, after he received its PhD in Applied Science from the Université Catholique de Louvain, he created the Belgian company IRIS with the financial help of the Belgian holding company Ackermans & van Haaren. Pierre De Muelenaere has been leading IRIS through all its development steps as president and CEO of the company. In 1999, the company was introduced on the stock market (Euronext). In 2008, the company, which has become a world-wide leader in the field of Intelligent Document Capture and Document Management had a staff of more than 500 people, with a revenue of more than €100 million.

In 2009, Pierre De Muelenaere initiated a strategic partnership with Canon and a first investment of 17% of Canon in IRIS.

In 2012, Pierre De Muelenaere negotiated the full takeover of IRIS by Canon.

The company was the delisted from the stock market.

Until the end of 2015, Pierre De Muelenaere remained President & CEO of IRIS and focused on the development of new technological and commercial partnerships with Canon.

At the end of 2015, he decided to leave the company to start new projects.

He has published a book on the IRIS adventure called "The IRIS Book: a 33 years story on Entrepreneurship from Belgium and what you can learn about it" (www.iris-book.com) This book is intended to share experience with the new generation of entrepreneurs.

He has also started new project such as coach at the Yncubator (www.yncubator.be, the incubator for students-entrepreneurs at the Université Catholique de Louvain), member of the investment committee at the QBIC Venture Capital fund (www.qbic.be, a fund financing spin-offs of several Belgian universities), etc..

Education 
Pierre De Muelenaere was born in Brussels. He received a civil engineering Degree in Electronics from the Université Catholique de Louvain in 1981 and a PhD in Applied science in 1987, from the same university.

Career 
Pierre De Muelenaere original background is Integrated circuit design and Artificial Intelligence. During his PhD, he has developed new microprocessor architectures dedicated to very fast Image Processing and Recognition. A prototype of a complete OCR system was also built in the University labs, based on a new generation of custom Image Processing ICs.
With the support of the Belgian holding Ackermans & van Haaren, and together with a fellow PhD student Jean-Didier Legat, Pierre founded IRIS (Image Recognition Integrated Systems) in April 1987, to bring this invention to the market, develop and market Optical character recognition (OCR) and Intelligent Document Recognition (IDR) products.

In 1992, Pierre De Muelenaere and  performed a Management buyout I.R.I.S.
In 1999, I.R.I.S. was introduced on the Brussels Stock Exchange, (BXS, now NYSE Euronext) and received the "1999 Best Belgian IPO Award" from BXS. I.R.I.S. has now more than 500 people, with offices in Belgium, Luxembourg, France, Germany, The Netherlands, Norway, USA and Hong-Kong. In 2008, the revenue was over €100millions.
Over the years, De Muelenaere has been a main contributor to the R&D vision of I.R.I.S. and has contributed to the development of many new I.R.I.S. technologies and products and to a number of patents filed by the company.  He also accumulated a solid international experience establishing strategic agreements with international partners in the US, Europe and Asia (such as HP, Canon, Kodak, Adobe, Fujitsu, Siemens, ...) contributing to the development of I.R.I.S. in the US and Asia.

Pierre De Muelenaere has received several Belgian awards including: two innovation awards from the Walloon Region (1989 and 2007), the "2001 Manager of the year award" from Trends, the "2002 Entrepreneur of the year award", the "2008 ICT personality of the year award" from DataNews.

He has been president and CEO of IRIS Group until the end of 2015, and a member of the board of several companies, including: BSB, Proximus, Pairi Daiza.

Pierre De Meulenaere is currently teaching creation, growth and management of enterprises at UCLouvain university.

References

External links 
 I.R.I.S.
 Belgacom
 BSB
 Pairi Daiza 

1958 births
Living people
Engineers from Brussels
Belgian chief executives
20th-century Belgian engineers
Businesspeople from Brussels
Software engineers
Walloon people